Earl Thomas With Paddy Milner & the Big Sounds is the fourth studio album by Paddy Milner and was released on 18 November 2008. Milner collaborated with the blues musician, Earl Thomas.

Track listing
 "See It My Way"
 "All You Need"
 "Right to Your Soul"
 "Same Old Blues"
 "Better to Have Loved & Lost"
 "Daylight"
 "Stone Cold Sober"
 "Lead a Horse to Water"
 "Deconstruct the Devil"
 "You've Got Me"

External links
Official Paddy Milner site

2008 albums
Paddy Milner albums